The canton of Verneuil d'Avre et d'Iton (before March 2020: canton of Verneuil-sur-Avre) is an administrative division of the Eure department, northern France. Its borders were modified at the French canton reorganisation which came into effect in March 2015. Its seat is in Verneuil d'Avre et d'Iton.

It consists of the following communes:
 
Acon
Armentières-sur-Avre
Bâlines
Les Barils
Bourth
Breux-sur-Avre
Chambois
Chennebrun
Courdemanche
Courteilles
Droisy
Gournay-le-Guérin
L'Hosmes
Illiers-l'Évêque
La Madeleine-de-Nonancourt
Mandres
Marcilly-la-Campagne
Mesnils-sur-Iton (partly)
Moisville
Nonancourt
Piseux
Pullay
Saint-Christophe-sur-Avre
Saint-Germain-sur-Avre
Saint-Victor-sur-Avre
Sylvains-les-Moulins
Tillières-sur-Avre
Verneuil d'Avre et d'Iton (partly)

References

Cantons of Eure